Granger is an unincorporated community in Bristol Township, Fillmore County, Minnesota, United States.

History
Granger was platted in 1857. A post office was established at Granger in 1857, and remained in operation until 1992. The community was named after Brown L. Granger, an early postmaster.

Notes

Unincorporated communities in Fillmore County, Minnesota
Unincorporated communities in Minnesota
1857 establishments in Minnesota Territory
Populated places established in 1857